Hyloscirtus condor is a species of tree frog native to Ecuador. Scientists know it exclusively from the type locality in the Reserva Biológica Cerro Plateado.

Description
The adult male frog measures 64.83–73.83 mm in snout-vent length. Hyloscirtus condor is tan with dark yellow dots around the body. Like Hyloscirtus tapichalaca, the species has a thumb spine. It also has a single, small vocal sac.  The iris of the eye is gold in color, with reticulations.

Entymology

The scientists named the frog after the place where the Cordillera del Cóndor, where it was found.

Original description

References

Frogs of South America
Amphibians described in 2014
Amphibians of Ecuador